Herb Curtis (born 1949) is a Canadian novelist and humorist who writes about and has long lived in New Brunswick. He is best known for writing the Brennen Siding Trilogy, three connected novels set in the fictional community of Brennen Siding, New Brunswick (loosely based on Kennan Siding, New Brunswick). The trilogy consists of the novels The Americans are Coming, The Last Tasmanian and The Lone Angler. The most critically acclaimed of the series is The Last Tasmanian which won the 1992 Thomas Head Raddall Award and was nominated for the Commonwealth Prize. In 1999, Curtis was nominated for the Stephen Leacock Memorial Medal for Humour for his collection of humorous stories, Luther Corhern's Salmon Camp Chronicles and in January 2018 he was presented with the pritedgious Sesquicentennial Medal in recognition of his valuable service to the nation.                                               

Curtis grew up near Blackville, New Brunswick, and currently resides in Fredericton. His novels The Americans are Coming and The Last Tasmanian have both been adapted for the stage, and the former has also become and a standard text in schools throughout Atlantic Canada and Quebec. The Canadian Encyclopedia</ref> In 2006, Curtis was a contributing author to The Penguin Anthology of Canadian Humour.

Works
The Americans are Coming - 1989
The Last Tasmanian - 1991
Look What the Cat Drug In - 1991
Slow Men Working In Trees - 1991
Hoofprints on the Sheets - 1993
The Lone Angler - 1993
The Silent Partner - 1996
The Scholten Story - 1996
Gifts to Last: Christmas Stories from the Maritimes and Newfoundland (Contributing Author) 1996
Luther Corhern's Salmon Camp Chronicles (1999)
Atlantica: Stories from the Maritimes and Newfoundland (Contributing Author) 2001
The Penguin Anthology of Canadian Humour (Contributing Author) 2006
Bruno Bobak (Contributing Author) 2006

References

Canadian humorists
Canadian male novelists
Writers from Fredericton
People from Northumberland County, New Brunswick
1949 births
Living people
20th-century Canadian novelists
20th-century Canadian male writers